Anthony Jones was a Welsh Anglican priest in the 17th century.

Jones was educated at Magdalen College, Oxford. He held livings at Penbryn, Dormington and Llantrisant. He was the archdeacon of St Davids from 1667 until his death on 22 June 1678.

References

1678 deaths
Alumni of Magdalen College, Oxford
Archdeacons of St Davids
Church in Wales archdeacons
17th-century Welsh Anglican priests